Erich Marcks (6 June 1891 – 12 June 1944) was a German general in the Wehrmacht during World War II.  He authored the first draft of the operational plan, Operation Draft East, for Operation Barbarossa, the invasion of the Soviet Union, advocating what was later known as A-A line as the goal for the Wehrmacht to achieve, within nine to seventeen weeks. Marcks studied philosophy in Freiburg in 1909.

Career
Born in 1891, Erich Marcks joined the Army in 1910 and fought in World War I. He completed General Staff Training and was transferred to the Imperial General Staff Corps in 1917. Marcks was awarded the Iron Cross 2nd Class and then 1st Class, and posted to the German Supreme Command. After the war, Marcks fought with the paramilitary Freikorps. He joined the Army of the German Republic (Reichsheer); between 1921 and 1933, he held several staff and command positions, and then served in the Ministry of Defense. On 1 April 1933, after Hitler came to power, Marcks was transferred to the army, serving as Chief of Staff of VIII Corps. He was a recipient of the Knight's Cross of the Iron Cross with Oak Leaves.

Operation Draft East

As Chief of Staff VIII Corps, Marcks took part in the attack on Poland and was promoted to Chief of Staff 18th Army, serving with it during the Battle of France. In the summer of 1940, Franz Halder, chief of OKH General Staff, directed Marcks to draft an initial operational plan for the invasion of the Soviet Union. Marcks produced a report entitled "Operation Draft East". Citing the need to "protect Germany against enemy bombers", the report advocated the A-A line as the operational objective of the invasion of "Russia" (sic). This goal was a line from Arkhangelsk on the Arctic Sea through Gorky and Rostov to the port city of Astrakhan at the mouth of the Volga on the Caspian Sea. Marcks envisioned that the campaign, including the capture of Moscow and beyond, would require between nine and seventeen weeks to complete.

Russia, Normandy and death

In December 1940 Marcks became commanding general of the 101st Light Infantry Division. In June 1941 he was gravely wounded in Ukraine, necessitating the amputation of his left leg. After his recovery, he was named commanding general of the 337th Infantry Division from March 1942 until September 1942. Marcks was promoted to General der Artillerie and was named commanding general of the LXXXIV Corps, which he commanded during the Allied Normandy Invasion, and having had his 53rd birthday on D-Day, he was wounded in an Allied air attack on 12 June 1944 and died the same day. Posthumously, he was awarded the Oak Leaves to the Knight's Cross of the Iron Cross (24 June 1944).

In popular culture

In the film The Longest Day, Marcks is played by Richard Münch. In the TV Movie Rommel, he is played by Hans Kremer.

Awards
 Iron Cross (1914) 2nd Class (25 September 1914) & 1st Class (August 1915)
 Clasp to the Iron Cross (1939) 2nd Class (21 September 1939) & 1st Class (29 September 1939)
 Knight's Cross of the Iron Cross with Oak Leaves
 Knight's Cross on 26 June 1941 as Generalleutnant and commander of  the 101 Light Infantry Division
 Oak Leaves on 24 June 1944 as general and commander of LXXXIV Army Corps

References

Citations

Bibliography

 
 
 

1891 births
1944 deaths
People from Schöneberg
People from the Province of Brandenburg
Generals of Artillery (Wehrmacht)
German Army personnel of World War I
German Army personnel killed in World War II
Recipients of the Knight's Cross of the Iron Cross with Oak Leaves
Recipients of the clasp to the Iron Cross, 1st class
German amputees
Military personnel of Württemberg
20th-century Freikorps personnel
Reichswehr personnel
Deaths by airstrike during World War II
Military personnel from Berlin
German Army generals of World War II